Wayne Worcester (born 1947) is an American journalist and author born in Keene, New Hampshire in 1947. He graduated from the University of New Hampshire and Columbia University Graduate School of Journalism and worked as a reporter and magazine writer. He became a journalism professor at the University of Connecticut in 1987.  He is the author of a series of Sherlock Holmes novels.

Biography
Worcester was a news reporter for the Providence Journal in Providence, Rhode Island for over a decade before he joined the faculty at the University of Connecticut as a journalism professor in 1987. He reported on the theft of more than $30 million worth of valuables from safe deposit boxes in 1975; most of the valuables belonged to the Patriarca crime family. He began working as a journalism professor in 1987 at the University of Connecticut in Storrs, Connecticut.

Worcester has been diagnosed with narcolepsy and has been featured in national media coverage of the illness, including NBC News.

Bibliography

Sherlock Holmes
The Monster of St. Marylebone (© 1999) 
The Jewel of Covent Garden (© 2000)

Short stories
"Sweet Rewards" (included in the mystery anthology And the Dying Is Easy (© 2001) )

Non-fiction
The Essential Researcher (©1993)

References 

American male journalists
Columbia University Graduate School of Journalism alumni
Living people
1947 births
People from Keene, New Hampshire